Saswihalli is a village in Dharwad district of Karnataka, India.

Demographics 
As of the 2011 Census of India there were 377 households in Saswihalli and a total population of 1,737 consisting of 865 males and 872 females. There were 221 children ages 0-6.

References

Villages in Dharwad district